Magdalon Monsen (19 April 1910 – 4 September 1953 in Stockholm) was a Norwegian football (soccer) player who competed in the 1936 Summer Olympics. He was a member of the Norwegian team, which won the bronze medal in the football tournament. Monsen died of complications after brain surgery.

References

External links

profile

1910 births
1953 deaths
Norwegian footballers
Footballers at the 1936 Summer Olympics
Olympic footballers of Norway
Olympic bronze medalists for Norway
Norway international footballers
Olympic medalists in football
Medalists at the 1936 Summer Olympics
Association football midfielders